The Orița is a 9×19mm Parabellum submachine gun that was manufactured in Romania during World War II and for several years afterwards. It was named for Captain Marin Orița (Military Technical Corps, Romanian Army), who is credited in Romania with its design. (Other sources describe the Orița as a joint Czech-Romanian project; the Czech Leopold Jašek and the Romanian Nicolae Sterca are also considered to have contributed to its design.) The mass production was made by CMC Uzinele Metallurgice Copșa Mică together with Cugir Arms Factory. The first version, Model 1941, entered operational service with the Romanian Army in 1943. Two later improved models were the Model 1948, with a fixed wooden stock, and the rare paratrooper Model 1949, with a folding metal stock. It remained in service with the Romanian Army until it was replaced in the 1960s by the more powerful Pistol Mitralieră model 1963/1965, a Romanian version of the AK-47 assault rifle. The Orița remained in service with the Romanian paramilitaries ("Gărzile Patriotice") until the 1970s.

With a production rate of 666 pieces per month as of October 1942, 6,000 were produced until October 1943.

A small quantity of these Romanian weapons was also used by the Wehrmacht during the last two years of the Second World War.

Other specifications
 Rifling: 6 right-hand grooves

Orita Carbine
A carbine version of the Orita was designed, chambered in 9×23mm Steyr. Only one prototype was built; it is preserved in the National Military Museum in Bucharest.

Notes

Sources
 
 Axworthy, Mark, Cornel I. Scafeș, and Cristian Crăciunoiu. (1995) Third Axis, Fourth Ally: Romanian Armed Forces in the European War, 1941–1945. London: Arms and Armour .
 König, Carol. Căpitanul Marin Orița—Inventator român de prestigiu din al doilea sfert al secolului al XX‑lea. Muzeul Militar Central, Studii și materiale de muzeografie și istorie militară, 10 (1977): 229–33. 
 .

External links 
 Orița Model 1941 Photograph from the Romanian Ministry of Defence.
 Orița Model 1941 Technical drawing.
 Orița submachine guns Photograph from the National Military Museum of Romania.

World War II submachine guns
9mm Parabellum submachine guns
Submachine guns of Romania
World War II military equipment of Romania